Lake Bel Air is a lake in the town of North Smithfield, in  Providence County, Rhode Island.

References

Lakes of Rhode Island
Lakes of Providence County, Rhode Island
North Smithfield, Rhode Island